Korean Army may refer to:

Currently
 The Korean People's Army (North Korea)
 The Republic of Korea Army (South Korea)

Historically
 The Japanese Korean Army (1904–45)
 The Imperial Korean Army
 The Joseon Army